Burrie Gildenhuys "BG" Uys is a South African rugby union player, who most recently played with the . His regular position is prop.

Career

Youth

Varsity Rugby

Leopards

Eastern Province Kings / Southern Kings

In 2013, while still contracted to the Leopards, Uys joined the  training group prior to the 2013 Super Rugby season, but was later released to the Leopards' 2013 Vodacom Cup squad.

In June 2014, he was selected on the bench for the  side to face  during a tour match during a 2014 incoming tour. He came on as a second-half replacement as the Kings suffered a 12–34 defeat.

Cheetahs

In July 2014,  coach Naka Drotské revealed that Uys would move to the Bloemfontein-based Super Rugby side for the 2014 Super Rugby season. This was later confirmed when he was named in the Cheetahs' wider training group prior to the season.

Representative rugby

He also played for a South African Barbarians (North) side that played against England during their 2012 tour of South Africa.

References

South African rugby union players
Living people
1988 births
People from Hessequa Local Municipality
Leopards (rugby union) players
Rugby union props
Rugby union players from the Western Cape